Maurice Clifford Rootes (12 April 1917 – 17 June 1997) was a British film editor.

Filmography
 Escape from Broadmoor (1948)
 The Last Days of Dolwyn (1949)
 Maria Chapdelaine (1950)
 A Tale of Five Cities (1951)
 The Last Page (1952)
 The Gambler and the Lady (1952)
 Four Sided Triangle (1953)
 Spaceways (1953)
 Blood Orange (1953)
 Face the Music (1954)
 Murder by Proxy (1954)
 Windfall (1955)
 Abdulla the Great (1955)
 Reluctant Bride (1955)
 One Way Out (1955)
 Three Crooked Men (1958)
 A Woman of Mystery (1958)
 On the Run (1958)
 A Woman Possessed (1958)
 She Knows Y'Know (1962)
 Jason and the Argonauts (1963)
 Siege of the Saxons (1963)
 Clash by Night (1963)
 First Men in the Moon (1964)
 Custer of the West (1967)
 Krakatoa: East of Java (1969)

References

External links
 

1917 births
1997 deaths
British film editors